Toya Gurung is a Nepali writer and poet. She served as the first female executive member of the Royal Nepal Academy. She headed the poetry department of Nepal Academy from 1994 to 2004. She has published multiple poetry collections  such as Dhopee and Toya Gurungka Lama Kavita and a short story collection called Kusum. He poems have also been translated in Hindi and English.

Biography 
She was born on 30 March 1948 (18 Chaitra 2004 BS) in Kodari village of Sindhupalchowk district, a village near the Sino-Nepalese border as the eldest of seven children to father Purna Bahadur Gurung and mother Padma Kumari Gurung. Her father was a Royal Nepal Army Major due to which she spent her childhood in multiple districts of Nepal. She received her high school education from Amar Hindi School in Calcutta, India. She started writing poems since an early age.

She received a master's degree in arts and a degree in law. She worked in a bank as a clerk to fund her education.

She was one of the founding member of the PEN Nepal.

Notable works 
Poetry collections and long poems

 Suryadaha (1985)
 Dhopee (1995)
 Dewal Ghumepachhi (1999)
 Toya Gurungka Lama Kavita (2003)
 Punarawati (2013)

Short story collection

 Kusum (2011)

Memoir

 Asprishya (2017)

Awards 
She has received multiple awards for her works such as ‘Pratibha Puraskar’ in 1986, ‘Bethit Literary Award’ in 1988 and Ratna Shree gold medal in 1989. She was awarded with Gangadevi Chaudhari Smriti Samman in 2017.

References

Living people
Nepalese women poets
Nepali-language writers
21st-century Nepalese poets
Place of birth missing (living people)
21st-century Nepalese women writers
20th-century Nepalese poets
1948 births
People from Sindhupalchowk District
Gurung people
Mahendra Morang Adarsh Multiple Campus alumni